The  is a river which flows through Nara Prefecture and Osaka Prefecture, Japan. It is designated Class A by the Ministry of Land, Infrastructure, Transport and Tourism (MLIT).

The river flows via towns:
Nara Prefecture
Yamatokōriyama
Osaka Prefecture
Kashiwara
Fujiidera - confluence with Ishikawa River

Since 1704 the river was reconfigured, originally its flow was north from the Ishikawa River confluence point, where it joined the Shirinashi River and Kizu River.

At the river mouth is a densely populated area and the river forms a natural border between Osaka and Sakai.

See also 
List of rivers of Japan

References 

Article contains translated text from 大和川 on the Japanese Wikipedia retrieved on 26 March 2017.

Rivers of Nara Prefecture
Rivers of Osaka Prefecture
Rivers of Japan
Tawaramoto, Nara